Ch'ŏnggang station is a railway station in Ch'ŏnggang-ri, Tongrim County, North P'yŏngan Province, North Korea. It is on located on the P'yŏngŭi Line of the Korean State Railway.

History
The station was opened, along with the rest of this section of the Kyŏngŭi Line, on 5 November 1905; it was originally called Tongrim station, receiving its current name in July 1945.

References

Railway stations in North Korea